Isla Partida is separated from Isla Espíritu Santo by a shallow, narrow channel. These two islands, in the Gulf of California, are protected by UNESCO as biospheres. They are located a short boat ride from La Paz, which lies on the Baja California Peninsula in Mexico.

References

Land area of islands in Mexico INEGI

Islands of Baja California Sur
Islands of the Gulf of California
La Paz Municipality (Baja California Sur)
Protected areas of Baja California Sur